Podgora may refer to several places:

Bosnia and Herzegovina 
Podgora, Breza, a village near Breza
Podgora, Fojnica, a village near Fojnica
Podgora, Lopare, a village near Lopare
Podgora, Milići, a village in Milići municipality

Croatia 
Podgora, Dubrovnik-Neretva County, a village in Dubrovačko Primorje municipality
Podgora, Split-Dalmatia County, a coastal town near Makarska
Podgora, Krapina-Zagorje County, a village in Kumrovec municipality

Italy 
Podgora (hill), a hill near Gorizia

Kosovo 
Podgora (region), a region in Metohija

Montenegro 
Podgora, Cetinje, a village
Podgora, Žabljak, a village

Poland 
Podgóra, Piaseczno County
Podgóra, Radom County

Slovenia 
Dolenja Podgora, a village in the Municipality of Črnomelj
Gorenja Podgora, a village in the Municipality of Črnomelj
Podgora, Dobrepolje, a village in the Municipality of Dobrepolje
Podgora (Ljubljana), a former settlement in the City Municipality of Ljubljana
Podgora pri Dolskem, a village in the Municipality of Dol pri Ljubljani
Podgora pri Ložu, a village in the Municipality of Loška Dolina
Podgora pri Zlatem Polju, a village in the Municipality of Lukovica
Podgora, Ravne na Koroškem, a village in the Municipality of Ravne na Koroškem
Podgora, Šmartno ob Paki, a village in the Municipality of Šmartno ob Paki
Podgora, Straža, a village in the Municipality of Straža

Serbia 
Pusta Reka (region), earlier only Reka, a region